Copper Creek is a ghost town in Pinal County, Arizona, United States. Copper Creek is located in a canyon in the Galiuro Mountains.

History 
This town once had around 50 buildings. It had a peak population of approximately 500. Its post office was established March 6, 1906 and was disestablished August 31, 1942. A short-lived narrow-gauge railway line was built in 1913, with the locomotive and cars carried overland from the railhead at Winkelman.

Notable remains of the old town include the foundations of the post office and the shell of the Sibley Mansion.

Geology
The Copper Creek mining district contains a substantial copper deposit; in recent years, several companies have proposed opening a mine there.  The district hosts more than 500 mineralized breccia pipes. Buried porphyry-style, stockwork copper mineralization has attracted exploration interest in recent years.

Geography 
Copper Creek is about ten miles east of the community of Mammoth, via a rough dirt road.

References

External links 
 
 History and historic photos of Copper Creek
 Copper Creek ghost town, photos and information
 Copper Creek – Ghost Town of the Month at azghosttowns.com

Ghost towns in Arizona
1906 establishments in Arizona Territory
Populated places established in 1906
Mining communities in Arizona
Former populated places in Pinal County, Arizona